Rachel Dawson (born August 2, 1985) is an American field hockey player. A midfielder / back, she earned her first senior career cap vs Australia on June 5, 2005. Dawson was named to the U.S. field hockey team for the 2008 Summer Olympics and 2012 Summer Olympics, with the team finishing in 8th and 12th respectively.

Dawson was born in Camden, New Jersey, one of eight children and grew up in Berlin, New Jersey, and attended Eastern Regional High School, where she graduated in 2003. She graduated from the University of North Carolina at Chapel Hill in 2007 and resides in North Carolina.

College 
In 2008, while at North Carolina, Dawson won the Honda Sports Award as the nation's best female field hockey player.

International senior competitions
 2006 – World Cup Qualifier, Rome (4th)

References

External links
 

1985 births
American female field hockey players
Eastern Regional High School alumni
Field hockey players at the 2008 Summer Olympics
Field hockey players at the 2011 Pan American Games
Field hockey players at the 2012 Summer Olympics
Field hockey players at the 2016 Summer Olympics
Living people
North Carolina Tar Heels field hockey players
Olympic field hockey players of the United States
People from Berlin, New Jersey
Sportspeople from Camden, New Jersey
Field hockey players at the 2015 Pan American Games
Pan American Games gold medalists for the United States
Pan American Games medalists in field hockey
Medalists at the 2011 Pan American Games
Medalists at the 2015 Pan American Games